Conza may refer to:

Places of Italy
Municipalities
Conza della Campania (commonly Conza), municipality of the Province of Avellino
Castelnuovo di Conza, municipality of the Province of Salerno
Sant'Andrea di Conza, municipality of the Province of Avellino

Other place names
Lago di Conza, a lake of Campania in the Province of Avellino
Sella di Conza, a mountain pass of Campania between the provinces of Salerno and Avellino

Personalities
Alfonso Gesualdo de Conza (1540-1603), an Italian cardinal
Landulf of Conza (???-979), Italian nobleman

See also
Count of Conza, a Renaissance title held by several noble Italian families of Campania
Compsa, the ancient city nearby the modern Conza